Manan Desai is an Indian actor, comedian, and a former Radio Jockey. He is co-founder of Gujarati YouTube channel The Comedy Factory. In past, he worked as a  RJ in My FM and Radio Mirchi. He was also in Indian comedy reality show Comedy Nights Bachao along with Amruta Khanvilkar. He acted in Gujarati films like Ventilator, Chor Bani Thangaat Kare, and Order Order Out Of Order.

Filmography

Television

References

External links

Gujarati people
People from Gujarat
People from Vadodara
Living people
Male actors in Gujarati-language films
Indian male film actors
21st-century Indian male actors
Indian male comedians
Indian stand-up comedians
1987 births